Many regional cuisines feature a mixed grill, a meal consisting of a traditional assortment of grilled meats.

List of mixed grill dishes
Mixed grill dishes include:
 Churrasco – typically featuring various cuts of chicken and beef, especially chicken hearts and picanha (rump cover).
 Fatányéros – a traditional Hungarian mixed grill barbecue dish
 Jerusalem mixed grill (Me'orav Yerushalmi; מעורב ירושלמי), contains chicken hearts, livers, spleen and bits of lamb grilled with onion, garlic and an array of Middle Eastern spices.
 
 
 Schlachteplatte – a German mixed grill dish

By region

 Australia: Similar to the English version (see below), it usually consists of bacon, lamb chops, rump steak, beef or pork sausages, eggs, lamb's fry and occasionally, tomatoes and pineapple.
 English mixed grill: Consisting of several of lamb chops, pork chops, sausages, chicken, lamb kidneys, beef steak, gammon, fried eggs, tomatoes and mushrooms, usually served with chips and peas.
 Italian: typically featuring chicken (often marinated in olive oil, garlic, lemon and rosemary), beef and pork.
 Latin American and Spanish barbecued pinchitos: Mixed grill, barbecued meat and vegetables on sticks, known as espetinhos, pinchos, pinchos americanos, brochetas, or anticuchos in Central and South America. These barbecued pinchos may include pieces of beef, pork, chicken, fish/shark, Mexican chorizo (or sausage), kidney, or liver, among others.
 South African mixed grill, featuring boerewors, eggs, lamb chops, rump steak.
 Arabian: Selection of shish kebabs, variously including chicken breast cubes, beef cubes, meat kofta, chicken kofta and lamb chops.
 Argentina: asado, featuring cuts of beef, kidney, liver and sausages (especially chorizo and morcilla, a form of blood sausage).
 South Asian (Bangladesh/India/Pakistan): Chicken tikka, mutton tikka, eaten with roti and chutney.
 United States (Kansas City) breakfast mixed grill, typically featuring a slice of ham, sausage links, bacon strips, eggs, home fries and buttered toast.

See also

 Kebab
 Skewer

References

External links
 Meurav Yerushalmi recipe

Barbecue
Culinary terminology
Meat dishes